Bloudan is a Syrian village located 51 kilometers north-west of Damascus, in the Rif Dimashq Governorate; it has an altitude of about 1500 meters. In the 2004 census by the Central Bureau of Statistics it had a population of 3,101. The majority of the inhabitants are Greek Orthodox Christians, and a significant minority are Sunni Muslims and Protestants.

Bloudan is situated on top of a hill that overlooks the Al-Zabadani plain and is surrounded by mountain forests. Its moderate temperature and low humidity in summer attracts many visitors from Damascus and throughout Syria; as a major tourist destination, it is visited by thousands every year, mainly Arabs from Lebanon and the Arab States of the Persian Gulf. In winter, Bloudan is usually snowy and draws many skiers. Bloudan has many restaurants and hotels, of which the most famous is the Great Bloudan Hotel which hosted the first pan-Arab Bloudan Conference to discuss the Palestinian issue in 1937. Bloudan is also famous for its many parks and springs, such as the Abuzad, Qas'a, and Hazir springs.

Climate
Bloudan has a relatively cool-summer Mediterranean type of climate [Csb] with a mean year average less than 11 degrees Celsius and abundant annual precipitation [both in the form of snow and rain] averaging 690 mm. Being about 1000 metres higher than the city centre of Damascus means that Bloudan and other settlements in its vicinity are sought-after by those who want to escape the arid and hot climate of the capital city. Summers in Bloudan are long, dry, and cool while the winter season is three months long with heavy rain and snow.

Etymology
The current name, Bloudan, is derived from the Aramaic name Bil-dan, which means the place of the god Bil or Ba'al. Bloudan is also called the land of almond, because its forests are dominated by almond trees.

History

Bloudan is a very ancient village whose history goes back to the Roman era, as is evident by the paintings and carvings found in southern Bloudan. Remains of an ancient Greek Orthodox monastery and the St. George church are also found in the mountains of eastern Bloudan. The historic St. Elias valley is an ancient part of the village, with buildings that are hundreds of years old.

In 1858, the population was noted as being Greek Orthodox, Protestant, and Muslim.

Modern Bloudan, constructed of rendered concrete, has largely replaced the Greek Orthodox village built in the 18th and 19th centuries and continues to grow today.

References

Bibliography

External links
Information, Syrian Tours. Retrieved on 1 December 2006.
بلودان, Syria Atlas. Retrieved on 1 December 2006.

Populated places in Al-Zabadani District
Eastern Orthodox Christian communities in Syria
Ski areas and resorts in Syria